The Star Virus is the first science fiction novel by Barrington J. Bayley, expanded from a 1964 short story originally published in New Worlds. The plot centers on the attempts of humanity, the star virus of the title, to break through a barrier around the galaxy.

Literary significance and reception
Rhys Hughes said that the novel was "mildly exciting" but faulted its impatience, lack of satisfactory explanations and "its callow attempt at mutating the ethics of the disaster-epic". However, he also notes that the novel's downbeat tone did go on to influence writers such as M. John Harrison.

Similarly, John Clute recognised the influence of the "complex and somewhat gloomy" novel on British SF, though he adds that readers of conventional space opera may have been alienated by Bayley's style and tone.

William S. Burroughs used the concept of "deadliners" from the novel in his own Nova Express, quoting Bayley's story in its New Worlds appearance.

References

1970 British novels
1970 science fiction novels
Ace Books books
Novels by Barrington J. Bayley
Debut science fiction novels
1970 debut novels